Quambatook is a disused railway station on the Robinvale railway line.

Disused railway stations in Victoria (Australia)